Lakshmana Mahapatro (7 June 1923 – August 1983) was an Indian politician. He was a Member of Parliament, representing Odisha in the Rajya Sabha the upper house of India's Parliament as a member of the Communist Party of India.

Mahapatro was murdered in Orissa in August 1983, at the age of 60.

References

1923 births
1983 deaths
Communist Party of India politicians from Odisha
Rajya Sabha members from Odisha